The 2002 United States Senate election in Mississippi was held on November 5, 2002. Incumbent Republican U.S. Senator Thad Cochran overwhelmingly won re-election to a fifth term. The Democratic Party did not field a candidate, resulting in Reform Party candidate Shawn O'Hara winning 15.42%. O'Hara's percentage of the vote was more than double Ross Perot's statewide total of 5.84% in the 1996 presidential election. His percentage was also the highest percentage for a Reform candidate in a senate election.

Major candidates

Reform 
 Shawn O'Hara, perennial candidate

Republican 
 Thad Cochran, incumbent U.S. Senator

General election

Predictions

Results

See also 
 2002 United States Senate elections

References 

2002 Mississippi elections
Mississippi
2002